The 2018 FIVB Women's Club World Championship was the 12th edition of the tournament. It was held in  Shaoxing, China from 4 to 9 December. Eight teams will compete in the tournament, including four wild cards.

Qualification

Pools composition

Squads

Venue

Pool standing procedure
 Number of matches won
 Match points
 Sets ratio
 Points ratio
 If the tie continues as per the point ratio between two teams, the priority will be given to the team which won the last match between them. When the tie in points ratio is between three or more teams, a new classification of these teams in the terms of points 1, 2 and 3 will be made taking into consideration only the matches in which they were opposed to each other.
Match won 3–0 or 3–1: 3 match points for the winner, 0 match points for the loser
Match won 3–2: 2 match points for the winner, 1 match point for the loser

Preliminary round
All times are China Standard Time (UTC+08:00).

Pool A

 

       
|}

|}

Pool B

|}

|}

Classification round
All times are China Standard Time (UTC+08:00).

Classification 5th–8th

|}

7th place match

|}

5th place match

|}

Final round
All times are China Standard Time (UTC+08:00).

Semifinals

|}

3rd place match

|}

Final

|}

Final standing

Awards

Most Valuable Player
 Zhu Ting (Vakıfbank İstanbul)
Best Opposite
 Tijana Bošković (Eczacıbaşı VitrA)
Best Outside Spikers
 Gabriela Guimarães (Minas Tênis Clube)
 Zhu Ting (Vakıfbank İstanbul)

Best Middle Blockers
 Mayany de Souza (Minas Tênis Clube)
 Milena Rašić (Vakıfbank İstanbul)
Best Setter
 Macris Carneiro (Minas Tênis Clube)
Best Libero
 Gizem Örge (Vakıfbank İstanbul)

See also
 2018 FIVB Volleyball Men's Club World Championship

References

External links
Official website
Formula

FIVB Volleyball Women's Club World Championship
FIVB Women's Club World Championship
International volleyball competitions hosted by China
FIVB
Sport in Zhejiang
December 2018 sports events in China